

Final standings

ACC tournament
See 1965 ACC men's basketball tournament

NCAA tournament

Regional semifinal
Princeton 66, NC State 48

Regional third-place game
NC State 103, Saint Joseph's 81

ACC's NCAA record
1-1

NIT
League rules prevented ACC teams from playing in the NIT, 1954–1966

External links
 Info at Sports-Reference.com